Desulfofaba gelida is a Gram-negative, sulfate-reducing and psychrophilic bacterium from the genus of Desulfofaba which has been isolated from marine mud from Hornsund in Norway.

References

Further reading

External links 
Type strain of Desulfofaba gelida at BacDive -  the Bacterial Diversity Metadatabase

Desulfobacterales
Bacteria described in 1999
Psychrophiles